Urban Hjärne (20 December 1641 – 10 March 1724) was a Swedish chemist, geologist, physician and writer.

Biography
He was born at Skworitz  near Nyenschantz  in Swedish Ingria.  He was the son of vicar Erlandus Jonæ Hiærne (1596–1654) and 	
Christina Tomasdotter Schmidt (1615–1682).

He was  admitted in 1655  to the high school  gymnasium in Dorpat. He went to Arva, where he studied until 1657. He  entered Uppsala University in 1658.  He began his medical education at Uppsala in 1661. For several years he visited Northern Europe's leading research center for medicine. He travelled to the Netherlands, England and France. In 1670 he became a doctor of medicine at Angers, France.  In 1674 he settled as a physician in Stockholm where his practice  primarily served the aristocracy.

In 1669 he was elected a Fellow of the Royal Society. He was appointed first physician to the King Charles XI of Sweden in 1684  and was  ennobled  in 1689.  He became assessor of the Board of Mines  (Bergskollegium) in 1675. He became head of the Laboratorium Chemicum in 1683. 

He was also the author of Stratonice, sometimes claimed to be the first Swedish novel, a partly autobiographical romance of seduction begun in 1665 and published in several parts, completed in 1668.

In Sweden, Urban Hjärne is also known for his fight against witch trials. He was a member of the Witchcraft Commission in the Katarina witch trials during the Great noise in 1676, and is remembered as one of the members of the Commission who started to feel scepticism toward witchraft and doubt the child wittnesses, leading to the wittnesses to be exposed as liars and the dissolution of the Katarina witch trials, the Witcraft Commission, and ultimately the entire Witch hunt.

Personal life
He built a research library of 3,500 books, one of the largest in Sweden. He married three times: first Maria Svahn, then Catharina Elisabeth Bergenhielm, and finally Elisabeth Carlsdotter. He died in Stockholm in 1724 and was buried at Bromma Church.

References

Other sources

Further reading

1641 births
1724 deaths
Ingria
18th-century Swedish chemists
18th-century Swedish geologists
17th-century Swedish physicians
Swedish male writers
Swedish-language writers
17th-century Swedish writers
17th-century male writers
People of the Swedish Empire
Uppsala University alumni
Fellows of the Royal Society
Critics of witch hunting